Lysekil Women's Match is an annual match racing sailing competition and event on the World Match Racing Tour. It is sailed in Fareast 28R yachts (2019).

Winners

Notes

References

Sailing competitions in Sweden
Match racing competitions
Recurring sporting events established in 2004
Women's International Match Racing Series